The 2010 WNBA season is the 14th season for the Los Angeles Sparks of the Women's National Basketball Association.

Transactions

Dispersal draft
Based on the Sparks' 2009 record, they would pick 8th in the Sacramento Monarchs dispersal draft. The Sparks waived their pick.

WNBA Draft
The following are the Sparks' selections in the 2010 WNBA Draft.

Transaction log
March 26, 2009: The Sparks signed-and-traded Temeka Johnson to the Phoenix Mercury for Phoenix's first-round pick in the 2010 draft.
May 5, 2009: The Sparks traded Rafaella Masciadri and a previously acquired first-round pick in the 2010 draft to the Minnesota Lynx in exchange for Noelle Quinn.
February 9: The Sparks signed free agent Ticha Penicheiro.
February 16: The Sparks signed LaToya Pringle.
April 29: The Sparks waived Angel Robinson.
May 7: The Sparks waived Vanessa Hayden.
May 11: The Sparks signed Lisa Willis and waived Karina Figueroa.
May 13: The Sparks traded a second-round pick in the 2011 Draft to the Chicago Sky in exchange for Kristi Toliver.
May 13: The Sparks waived LaToya Pringle, Lisa Willis and Rashidat Junaid.
May 14: The Sparks waived Shannon Bobbitt and Bianca Thomas.
June 1: The Sparks waived Tiffany Stansbury and signed Chanel Mokango.

Trades

Free agents

Additions

Subtractions

Roster

Depth

Season standings

Schedule

Preseason

|- align="center" bgcolor="bbffbb"
| 1 || May 1 || 10:00pm || China National Team || 78-58 || Junaid (15) || Mohammed (12) || Penicheiro (7) || Viejas Arena  3,874 || 1-0
|- align="center" bgcolor="ffbbbb"
| 2 || May 8 || 3:30pm || San Antonio || 77-86 || Ferdinand-Harris (13) || 3 players (5) || Bobbitt, Quinn (4) || Walter Pyramid  1,521 || 1-1
|-

Regular season

|- align="center" bgcolor="ffbbbb"
| 1 || May 15 || 2:00pm || @ Phoenix || ESPN2 || 77-78 || Parker (24) || Parker (12) || Riley (4) || US Airways Center  14,772 || 0-1
|- align="center" bgcolor="ffbbbb"
| 2 || May 16 || 9:00pm || @ Seattle || KONG || 67-81 || Thompson (19) || Parker (11) || Penicheiro (6) || KeyArena  9,686 || 0-2
|- align="center" bgcolor="ffbbbb"
| 3 || May 22 || 8:00pm || @ San Antonio || NBATVFS-SW || 81-88 || Milton-Jones (20) || Parker, Thompson (10) || Milton-Jones (6) || AT&T Center  7,862 || 0-3
|- align="center" bgcolor="bbffbb"
| 4 || May 28 || 10:30pm || Washington || PRIME || 81-75 || Parker (30) || Parker (10) || Parker (5) || STAPLES Center  13,154 || 1-3
|- align="center" bgcolor="ffbbbb"
| 5 || May 30 || 8:00pm || Atlanta ||  || 82-101 || Parker (32) || Parker (12) || Penicheiro (6) || STAPLES Center 8,404 || 1-4
|-

|- align="center" bgcolor="ffbbbb"
| 6 || June 4 || 10:00pm || @ Phoenix ||  || 89-90 || Parker (26) || Parker (12) || Penicheiro (10) || US Airways Center  6,485 || 1-5
|- align="center" bgcolor="ffbbbb"
| 7 || June 5 || 11:00pm || Seattle || NBATVFS-W || 75-79 || Parker (24) || Parker (8) || Lennox, Parker (4) || Home Depot Center  6,026 || 1-6
|- align="center" bgcolor="bbffbb"
| 8 || June 8 || 10:30pm || Phoenix || PRIME || 92-91 || Parker (22) || Parker (12) || Quinn (7) || STAPLES Center  7,993 || 2-6
|- align="center" bgcolor="ffbbbb"
| 9 || June 11 || 10:00pm || @ Seattle || KONG || 60-82 || Parker (13) || Parker (7) || 4 players (2) || KeyArena  7,286 || 2-7
|- align="center" bgcolor="bbffbb"
| 10 || June 13 || 3:00pm || Minnesota ||  || 88-84 || Milton-Jones (22) || Parker (7) || Penicheiro (5) || STAPLES Center  7,005 || 3-7
|- align="center" bgcolor="ffbbbb"
| 11 || June 18 || 10:30pm || Connecticut ||  || 75-78 || Thompson (24) || Milton-Jones, Quinn (6) || Penicheiro (8) || STAPLES Center  8,852 || 3-8
|- align="center" bgcolor="ffbbbb"
| 12 || June 24 || 7:00pm || @ Washington || CSN-MA || 53-68 || Toliver (11) || Quinn (7) || Penicheiro (6) || Verizon Center  8,160 || 3-9
|- align="center" bgcolor="ffbbbb"
| 13 || June 27 || 3:00pm || @ Atlanta || NBATVSSO || 81-89 || Milton-Jones, Toliver (19) || Milton-Jones (11) || Penicheiro (10) || Philips Arena  7,855 || 3-10
|- align="center" bgcolor="ffbbbb"
| 14 || June 29 || 10:30pm || New York || NBATVPRIME || 68-80 || Quinn (24) || Thompson (6) || Ferdinand-Harris, Quinn (4) || STAPLES Center  8,602 || 3-11
|-

|- align="center" bgcolor="bbffbb"
| 15 || July 1 || 10:30pm || San Antonio ||  || 73-63 || Thompson (24) || Thompson (10) || Penicheiro (4) || STAPLES Center  7,803 || 4-11
|- align="center" bgcolor="ffbbbb"
| 16 || July 3 || 5:00pm || Seattle || ESPN2 || 62-75 || Toliver (18) || Thompson, Wisdom-Hylton (10) || Penicheiro (5) || STAPLES Center  9,319 || 4-12
|- align="center" bgcolor="ffbbbb"
| 17 || July 6 || 10:00pm || Phoenix || ESPN2 || 89-98 || Milton-Jones (20) || Milton-Jones (8) || Milton-Jones (6) || STAPLES Center  8,336 || 4-13
|- align="center" bgcolor="bbffbb"
| 18 || July 13 || 7:00pm || @ Tulsa || ESPN2 || 87-71 || Thompson (24) || Penicheiro (7) || Penicheiro (9) || BOK Center  7,073 || 5-13
|- align="center" bgcolor="ffbbbb"
| 19 || July 16 || 8:30pm || @ Chicago || CN100 || 68-80 || Milton-Jones (21) || Quinn (6) || Penicheiro (9) || Allstate Arena  4,841 || 5-14
|- align="center" bgcolor="ffbbbb"
| 20 || July 18 || 3:00pm || @ San Antonio ||  || 73-83 || Thompson (23) || Thompson (8) || Penicheiro, Quinn (6) || AT&T Center  6,542 || 5-15
|- align="center" bgcolor="bbffbb"
| 21 || July 20 || 3:00pm || Tulsa ||  || 86-83 (OT) || Milton-Jones (23) || Penicheiro (7) || Penicheiro (13) || STAPLES Center  14,413 || 6-15
|- align="center" bgcolor="ffbbbb"
| 22 || July 22 || 7:00pm || @ Indiana || ESPN2 || 57-76 || Thompson (19) || Milton-Jones, Thompson (8) || Penicheiro (6) || Conseco Fieldhouse  7,898 || 6-16
|- align="center" bgcolor="bbffbb"
| 23 || July 24 || 7:00pm || @ Connecticut ||  || 89-80 || Milton-Jones (20) || Penicheiro, Quinn (7) || Milton-Jones, Penicheiro (7) || Mohegan Sun Arena  8,097 || 7-16
|- align="center" bgcolor="bbffbb"
| 24 || July 27 || 8:00pm || @ Minnesota ||  || 71-58 || Thompson (24) || Milton-Jones, Quinn, Thompson (8) || Penicheiro (9) || Target Center  6,215 || 8-16
|- align="center" bgcolor="ffbbbb"
| 25 || July 30 || 7:30pm || @ New York ||  || 79-88 || Thompson (18) || Wisdom-Hylton (6) || Penicheiro (7) || Madison Square Garden  14,307 || 8-17
|-

|- align="center" bgcolor="bbffbb"
| 26 || August 4 || 10:30pm || Chicago || NBATVCN100 || 82-77 || Milton-Jones (22) || Wisdom-Hylton (13) || Penicheiro (15) || STAPLES Center  9,732 || 9-17
|- align="center" bgcolor="bbffbb"
| 27 || August 6 || 10:30pm || Tulsa ||  || 77-70 || Milton-Jones (23) || Milton-Jones, Penicheiro, Quinn (7) || Penicheiro (13) || STAPLES Center  8,962 || 10-17
|- align="center" bgcolor="ffbbbb"
| 28 || August 8 || 8:00pm || San Antonio || NBATVFS-WFSSW || 83-92 || Thompson (23) || Penicheiro (9) || Penicheiro (8) || STAPLES Center  9,793 || 10-18
|- align="center" bgcolor="ffbbbb"
| 29 || August 10 || 10:00pm || Indiana || ESPN2 || 76-82 || Thompson (21) || Thompson (13) || Riley (6) || STAPLES Center  10,586 || 10-19
|- align="center" bgcolor="bbffbb"
| 30 || August 12 || 8:00pm || @ Minnesota ||  || 78-77 || Milton-Jones (21) || Thompson (8) || Penicheiro (10) || Target Center  7,867 || 11-19
|- align="center" bgcolor="bbffbb"
| 31 || August 14 || 8:00pm || @ Tulsa || COX || 92-87 || Thompson (24) || Thompson (11) || Penicheiro (9) || BOK Center  5,719 || 12-19
|- align="center" bgcolor="ffbbbb"
| 32 || August 17 || 10:30pm || Phoenix || NBATVPRIME || 84-90 || Thompson (33) || Penicheiro (9) || Penicheiro (11) || STAPLES Center  8,817 || 12-20
|- align="center" bgcolor="bbffbb"
| 33 || August 20 || 10:30pm || Minnesota ||  || 98-91 || Thompson (26) || Thompson (9) || Penicheiro (12) || STAPLES Center  13,154 || 13-20
|- align="center" bgcolor="ffbbbb"
| 34 || August 21 || 11:00pm || @ Seattle || ESPN2 || 75-76 || Thompson (20) || Milton-Jones (9) || Penicheiro (8) || KeyArena  9,686 || 13-21
|-

| All games are viewable on WNBA LiveAccess

Postseason

|- align="center" bgcolor="ffbbbb"
| 1 || August 25 || 11:00pm || @ Seattle || ESPN2 || 66-79 || Ferdinand-Harris (18) || Milton-Jones (8) || Toliver (5) || KeyArena  10,589 || 0-1 
|- align="center" bgcolor="ffbbbb"
| 2 || August 28 || 3:00pm || Seattle || ESPN2 || 66-81 || Thompson (18) || Milton-Jones (9) || Thompson (5) || STAPLES Center  8,326 || 0-2 
|-

Statistics

Regular season

Postseason

Awards and honors
Candace Parker was named WNBA Western Conference Player of the Week for the week of May 22, 2010.
Tina Thompson was named WNBA Western Conference Player of the Week for the week of August 7, 2010.
Tina Thompson was named WNBA Western Conference Player of the Week for the week of August 14, 2010.
Tina Thompson was named WNBA Western Conference Player of the Month for August.

References

External links

Los Angeles Sparks seasons
Los Angeles
Los Angeles Sparks